CT Special Forces: Back to Hell (known in North America as CT Special Forces 2: Back in the Trenches) is a run and gun video game developed by French studio Light and Shadow Productions and published by Hip Interactive. It was released on August 15, 2003 in Europe, and on June 29, 2004 in North America. It's a sequel to CT Special Forces. PlayStation version was developed by Wizarbox.

Reception 
CT Special Forces 2 received higher marks from critics than its predecessor, CT Special Forces. IGN's Craig Harris remarked, "... is a decidedly better, more impressive game experience than the original." He still noted the room for improvement in the series, however.

References 

2003 video games
Game Boy Advance games
Multiplayer and single-player video games
PlayStation (console) games
Run and gun games
Video game sequels
Video games developed in France
Wizarbox games